Nukleopatra is the sixth studio album from British synth-pop band Dead or Alive.  Still a massive success in Japan, Epic Records released Nukleopatra there in 1995. Left without a record contract in the UK and the US, this album did not get released in other territories until years later. Nukleopatra was eventually issued on several different labels, with varying track listings, timings and album artwork.

Production
The band initially signed a worldwide release deal with PWL and began recording at PWL Studios. Recording was started on new tracks cowritten and produced by Mike Stock, but the sessions were aborted when Stock abruptly quit PWL over his dissatisfaction with his share of publishing royalties on the new Dead Or Alive material. Work on new material recommenced with PWL staffer Barry Stone taking over co-production duties.

The album contains remixed versions of the 1990 tracks "Unhappy Birthday" and "Gone Too Long" from Fan the Flame (Part 1). Also included is "Sex Drive", originally recorded and released by Pete Burns as a one-time guest vocalist for Italian house music act Glam, and the first single from the album; a cover of David Bowie's "Rebel Rebel", which was released under the short-lived pseudonym International Chrysis.

Earlier versions of the tracks "Sleep with You" and "International Thing" were previously written and part-produced for the cancelled album Fan the Flame (Part 2) in 1992, as "I Want 2 B with U" and "U Were Meant 4 Me" respectively. 

"Total Stranger", a song from Fan the Flame (Part 1) was remixed during the sessions for inclusion on the album along the other 2 newly remixed tracks from that album. The remix later evolved into "I'm a Star", which has similar chords to Total Stranger as well. In the 2021 Invincible reissue, there was a "7" Mix" of the song released, which has a more simple structure, and more similarities to Total Stranger. It's probably an earlier mix.

An initial demo of "Rebel Rebel", which featured some new lyrics written by Burns, was blocked by Bowie—who legally denied permission to use Burns' new lyrics, and also unsuccessfully requested the track not be covered by the band at all. In 1997, Burns claimed that some of the covers were included as "album fillers" after studio time to write new material was cut short when "the record label started to fall to bits".

While the album was released as scheduled in Japan, the planned UK release was pulled when Dead Or Alive left PWL Records after label head Pete Waterman refused the band's request to use Paul Oakenfold and other outside remixers to work on further singles, and instead insisted he wanted to write and produce for the band himself.

The original Japanese release and "Invincible" reissue feature longer mixes of the tracks "Nukleopatra" and "Sex Drive". The European/Australian version includes a longer, different version of "Rebel Rebel".

The European/Australian and the US versions both swap the re-recorded version of "Unhappy Birthday" with that song's original 1990 12" remix, previously released as the 'Ninja Billy Mix'. This version of the album also includes the 1996 'Sugar Pumpers Radio Remix' of "You Spin Me Round (Like a Record)".

The US version features shortened versions of "Getting It On" and "Spend the Night Together". It also includes an exclusive 'Jail House Mix' of "You Spin Me Round (Like a Record)" and the 'Scream Driven Mix' of "Sex Drive". Both the 'Sugar Pumpers Radio Remix' of "You Spin Me Round (Like a Record)" and the 'Scream Driven Mix' of "Sex Drive" later appeared on the US double CD You Spin Me Round / Sex Drive remixes.

Track listing

Personnel
Pete Burns – vocals
Jason Alburey – keyboards
Dean Bright – keyboards, keytar
Steve Coy – drums, bass guitar, guitars

Charts

References

External links

1995 albums
Dead or Alive (band) albums
Epic Records albums